Fantastic Locations: Fields of Ruin is an adventure module for the 3.5 edition of the Dungeons & Dragons fantasy role-playing game.

Plot summary
In Fantastic Locations: Fields of Ruin, the player characters must follow the King's Road to the ruins of the Keep of Fallen Kings, in order to retrieve the fabled Earthcrown.

Publication history
Fantastic Locations: Fields of Ruin was written by Richard Pett, and was published in April 2006. Cover art was by Francis Tsai, with interior art by Andrew Trabbold.

Reception

References

Dungeons & Dragons modules
Role-playing game supplements introduced in 2006